Courtney Lanair Brown (born February 14, 1978) is a former American college and professional football player who was a defensive end in the National Football League (NFL) for seven seasons. He played college football for Pennsylvania State University, and earned consensus All-American honors. The Cleveland Browns selected him with the first overall pick of the 2000 NFL Draft, and he played professionally for the Browns and Denver Broncos of the NFL.

Brown is often listed as a draft bust, noted among others such as 2014 1st round picks Justin Gilbert and Johnny Manziel.

Early years
Brown was born in Charleston, South Carolina.  Growing up in Alvin, South Carolina, he attended Macedonia High School and was a high school All-American linebacker his senior year.  He also contributed on offense by playing tight end. Brown earned Gatorade Player-of-the-Year accolades in his senior year. He played in the Shrine Bowl. Brown was also an accomplished basketball star, playing in the North/South All-Star game. Throughout his high school career, he maintained a 4.0 grade point average. Furthermore, he never missed a day of school from K-12.

College career
Brown attended Pennsylvania State University, where he played for coach Joe Paterno's Penn State Nittany Lions football team from 1996 to 1999.  At Penn State, he was teammates with LaVar Arrington and Brandon Short.  As senior in 1999, he was a first-team All-Big Ten selection, and was recognized as a consensus first-team All-American.  Brown earned the Big Ten Defensive Player of the Year and Defensive Linemen of the Year honors in his senior year. He was also a finalist for three national awards: Bronko Nagurski Trophy, Chuck Bednarik Award and Lombardi Award.  He finished his college football career with an NCAA record-breaking 33 quarterback sacks and 70 tackles for a loss.

He graduated from Penn State with a Bachelor of Arts degree in integrative arts in 2000.

Professional career

Pre-draft
At the Penn State Pro Day, Brown measured 6'4⅞", 271 pounds, ran a 4.52 seconds forty-yard dash, had a vertical leap of 37" and bench-pressed 225 pounds 26 times.

Cleveland Browns
Brown was drafted by the Browns first overall in the 2000 NFL Draft, making him the eleventh defensive lineman to be taken first overall in the 70-plus year history of the NFL Draft.

Brown had a productive rookie season, recording 69 total tackles and 4.5 sacks. His second season was cut short due to injury, but Brown recorded 4.5 sacks in five games. Brown had problems staying healthy for the rest of his career, and struggled on the field. From 2002–2004, Brown only played in 26 games and recorded just nine sacks. He finished his professional football career with the Broncos in 2005. The Broncos that season finished 13–3, and in the playoffs, defeated the defending back-to-back Super Bowl champion New England Patriots, led by fellow 2000 draftee Tom Brady, before losing to the eventual Super Bowl champion Pittsburgh Steelers in the AFC Championship Game.

NFL career statistics

References

External links
 Denver Broncos bio

1978 births
Living people
African-American players of American football
All-American college football players
American football defensive ends
Cleveland Browns players
Denver Broncos players
National Football League first-overall draft picks
Penn State Nittany Lions football players
Sportspeople from Charleston, South Carolina
Players of American football from South Carolina
21st-century African-American sportspeople
20th-century African-American sportspeople
Ed Block Courage Award recipients